The Monk is a 2011 thriller drama film directed by Dominik Moll. It is an adaptation of Matthew Lewis's 1796 gothic novel of the same name, and chronicles the story and downfall of a Capucin Ambrosio (Vincent Cassel), a well-respected monk in Spain. An international co-production between France and Spain, it was partially shot in the barri vell of the city of Girona in Catalonia.

Plot

The film begins with the titular Monk, Ambrosio, listening with blank passivity to a nameless man who confesses horrific sexual sins, including the rape and incest of his niece. The monk quietly listens to the man admit to his sexual desires for his niece, Ambrosio only interrupting to remind the confessor that “No woman is worthless” after he declares that no woman compares to his niece. Ambrosio takes this moment to pontificate on how sins are impossible to judge from his point of view and that they are all sins, nonetheless. The man asks the monk if he does not fear the power of the devil, to which Ambrosio firmly states, “Satan has only the power we give him” with no further reprimanding or preaching to this sinner shown. After the credits, the film flashes back to show Ambrosio’s past in December 1595, on Saint Ambrose’s night. As a baby, he is almost drowned but is then abandoned at the Capuchin monastery by a nameless white-haired man. The voice-over narration explains that Ambrosio was adopted, christened Capuchin Ambrosio, and cared for by the Capuchin monks, despite their initial fear that his hand-shaped birthmark is a sign of the Devil. He grows and learns about the scripture, joining the monastery at 18 and quickly becomes a respected head of the community and renowned sermon preacher.

Antonia and her Aunt Leonella are introduced attending one of these renowned sermons, where Antonia is struck with Ambrosio's eloquence and preaching. The young Antonia faints and is carried to a separate room by the charming Lorenzo, who introduces himself as being from the wealthy Medina family. Antonia rushes off, wishing to return to her ailing mother and tell her about the day.

Ambrosio visits Father Miguel to check on his ailing health and inform him of the odd dream he had in which he sees but cannot touch an unknown woman dressed in crimson praying, although he feels like he knows her. Father Miguel suggests it is the Virgin Mary, who the monks are close to but cannot reach, to which Ambrosio does not respond.

Valerio is introduced to the Capuchin monastery by his godfather, Imanol Estevez, who explains that they are from Burgos, where Valerio was in a house fire, explaining the mask as necessary due to terrible burns inflicted on him in a fire that killed his parents. He wishes to join the monastery as a novice, and after some private debate amongst the monks in which Ambrosio alone argues for him being allowed to stay despite his differences, they agree to let the young man stay. While being shown to his room by another novice, Valerio asks if they are allowed to speak with Ambrosio to which the novice notes that they can except when he is in his rose garden where he goes to escape his frequent headaches.

Ambrosio is next seen acting as the confessor for some nuns. After confessing to minuscule sins, Sister Agnes is leaving when a note drops out of her habit, revealing that she is in love with a man named Cristobal who she names in the letter. Although she begs with him to have mercy, Ambrosio refuses to hide her secret, tells her she must be severely punished to cleanse herself of her sins, and gives her over to the prioress of the nunnery to punish her as she sees fit.

Don Lorenzo comes to visit Antonia at her home and meets with her mother who forbids him to marry her daughter until he gets his uncle’s approval, revealing that she was married to the wealthy Las Cisternas despite her poor origins which caused her husband to be disinherited and become regretful and spiteful after being forced to move to Caracaras. Wishing to save her daughter from the same fate, she insists that he get his final living relative’s approval before she will allow him to pursue Antonia.

The ailing Father Miguel reveals to Ambrosio that he is convinced something evil is prowling in the monastery and asks if there have been any recent possessions nearby, to which Ambrosio says a shepherd in a nearby hamlet was. Father Miguel warns Ambrosio to be wary and alert. That same night after leaving Father Miguel’s chamber, Ambrosio gets a debilitating headache and goes to his rose garden, where Valerio follows him and offers to heal Ambrosio with what he claims is a gift of healing passed down from his mother. Even though Ambrosio snaps at him to leave, Valerio places his hands on Ambrosio’s head, offering relief and then leaves.

While being interrogated by the prioress, it is revealed that Agnes is pregnant. To punish her for breaking her vows in the convent garden, she is sentenced to die of hunger and thirst in the abbey dungeon. Agnes curses Ambrosio for not showing her mercy.

Ambrosio confronts Valerio and thanks him for healing him. Valerio then asks if it is alright to lie, to which Ambrosio says one can hide the truth if it is for a higher purpose. Ambrosio is shown sitting in front of a painting of the Madonna while reflecting on his assistance with the exorcism of the shepherd mentioned to Father Miguel earlier. During these reflections, he hears a noise and finds Father Miguel who says “He’s here. I’ve seen him” with his dying breaths. A funeral is held for Father Miguel and Agnes is shown begging for mercy for her child then cursing Ambrosio again.

Ambrosio is woken by his dream of the woman in red, and he goes to the rose garden where he again runs into Valerio who is crying. Ambrosio asks him to confide, and after much prompting and promising not to kick him out of the monastery, Valerio admits to entering the monastery to be closer to Ambrosio and takes of his mask to reveal that he is a woman. At this revelation and despite her protestations, Ambrosio tells Valerio she must leave in the morning. She asks for a rose as a parting gift, and while picking one, Ambrosio is bit by a poisonous centipede. It is declared that there is no hope for healing Ambrosio, and while the other monks are praying and Father Andres, who is keeping watch, is sleeping, Valerio sucks the poison from Valerio’s hand and sexually assaults him, which to him appears as a fever dream. The next morning, Ambrosio is doing better and the other monks believe it is a miracle.

Lorenzo takes Antonia on an outing, under Leonella’s supervision. While they are being rowed on a river, he admits his feelings for her, and she prompts him to go see his uncle in Saragossa and be patient with her. He is shown riding away.

Agnes’ body is shown being taken from the prison and the prioress orders her to be made decent looking for her funeral.

While greeting the other monks after recovering, Ambrosio notices that Valerio is not present, to which Father Andres says he is ill and will not permit anyone to see him. Ambrosio visits Valerio at night, and she reveals that only she can get herself the cure and will only do it if  he allows her to stay. He agrees and accompanies her to the graveyard, where she descends into a hole leading into a grave. While waiting for her to return, Ambrosio sees Agnes’s ghost who accuses him of having sinned in the flesh and being responsible for her and her son’s death. Matilda returns healed and Ambrosio asks her what happened after she drew the poison out of him last night to which she says nothing and kisses him. While leaving Valerio’s room, Ambrosio is confronted by a monk who claims he knows that they are sinning together and will tell everyone tomorrow. While heading back to his room, the accusatory monk avoids certain dark areas of the monastery and is hit by a falling gargoyle in the rose garden. During that same night, Antonia’s mother is distraught and expresses regret for how her and Antonia’s life has turned out.

The next morning, the dead monk is found, and while investigating the fallen gargoyle on the roof, Ambrosio sees the woman in crimson from his dream. It is revealed to be Antonia, who has come to request that Ambrosio visit her mother to bring her comfort. He agrees and goes to her, where Elvire confesses that she had a son before Antonia named Mateo, but that she left him behind when she fled from Madrid and the Marquis killed him out of spite. He eases her conscience by telling her it is okay because she was young, and if she had died she would not have had Antonia.

Ambrosio gives another sermon to the masses, with Antonia in attendance, where he makes a show of putting on a crown of thorns. While Father Andres is cleaning his head injuries after, Ambrosio asks if his sermon was as persuasive as usual, and his friend insists that it was more so. He is then shown visiting Antonia in a garden, where he recites a Psalm at her request and attempts to kiss her. She demands he leave and never return. Lorenzo returns just after, and Antonia embraces him happily.

Ambrosio goes to Valerio and tries to sexually engage with her, but she refuses saying she does not want to because he no longer desires her. She reveals that she knows he lusts for Antonia, and that she can help him. She admits that she has control of demons, which is how she cured herself in the cemetery that night. She also reveals that Antonia is going to get married to Lorenzo and will be out of reach soon. She goes to the cemetery and returns with a sprig of myrtle that will open any locked door and will enchant Antonia if she smells it. During the procession of Saint Mary, Ambrosio sneaks into Antonia’s room, where after smelling the flower she wakes up and they engage in sexual intercourse. Elvire dreams of her first born who has the same hand birthmark on his shoulder, revealing that Ambrosio is Mateo and thus her son. She wakes up and goes into Antonia’s room where she sees the naked Ambrosio and his birthmark. He stabs her with scissors. As Elvire dies, she utters the word "Mateo", indicating that Ambrosio now knows that he is Antonia’s older brother. Antonia wakes up and screams, alerting Lorenzo who sings below her window.

Ambrosio is delivered to the Inquisition where he is condemned to death by starvation. While awaiting his sentence in prison, Valerio appears to him adorned in a gown and jewels, revealing herself as an instrument of Satan in female form and she states that someone wants to meet Ambrosio. The monk is then shown wandering a desolate, rocky desert barefoot and in rags. While lying down in the sun, the confessor from the first scene of the film approaches him and congratulates him on his intense sins and reveals his identity as the Devil. The Devil offers Ambrosio an eternity of pleasure by selling his soul, but Ambrosio demands instead the deal to be used to save Antonia from madness. The Devil agrees and Ambrosio sells his soul. He then dies, without hope for himself, and his corpse is devoured by crows.

Characters 
Ambrosio is a renowned Monk known for his piety and ability to preach. He was left at the monastery as a baby and raised by the Capuchin monks, taking the vows himself at 18. After meeting Valerio, he commits increasingly heinous crimes against his Catholic vocation and Italian society.

Antonia is a young and innocent woman who first sees Ambrosio preaching and is immediately struck by his moral teachings. She is Elvire’s daughter, and Leonella’s niece. Antonia becomes engaged to Lorenzo during the film, but is supernaturally seduced by Ambrosio, and loses her mind because of it by the end of the film.

The Devil is disguised as one of Ambrosio’s confessors who often frequents the monastery to hear his preaching. He appears in the opening scene, a scene where Ambrosio is preaching, and at the end where he reveals himself to be supernatural when he meets Ambrosio in the desert and offers him safety in return for his soul.

Elvire is Antonia’s ill mother who lives with her daughter and sister in Madrid. She married the son of the wealthy Las Cisternas family, leading to his disinheritance and his eventual distain of her. After his death, she moved her daughter to Madrid and wishes her to marry in her station to avoid her life path. It is revealed that Ambrosio is her son after she confesses to having had a first born son with a hand mark that she deserted when fleeing her husband’s angry father. She is killed by Ambrosio with scissors when she discovers he and Antonia naked in bed together.

Father Andres is the older monk who acts as a physician in the Capuchin monastery. He tries to heal Ambrosio after he is bitten by the poisonous centipede in the rose garden.

Father Miguel is the monk who found Ambrosio outside of the Capuchin monastery when he was left. He acts as a confidant to Ambrosio before he dies in Ambrosio’s arms warning him of evil.

Leonella is Antonia’s aunt and Elvire’s sister who is often chaperoning Antonia.

Lorenzo is Antonia’s suitor from the wealthy Medina family. He spends the film getting permission to marry Antonia from her mother and his uncle and serenading Antonia outside of her window.

Valerio is a demon who presents itself first as the burned and masked Valerio, then the seductive temptress who heals Ambrosio, seduces him, and helps him gain access to Antonia.

Cast

 Vincent Cassel as Capucino Ambrosio
 Déborah François as Valerio
 Joséphine Japy as Antonia
 Catherine Mouchet as Elvire
 Geraldine Chaplin as l'abbesse
 Sergi López as The Devil 
 Jordi Dauder as Père Miguel
 Roxane Duran as Sœur Agnès
 Frédéric Noaille as Lorenzo
 Javivi as Frère Andrés

Differences between the Book and Film 

 Structure and Character Focus
 The book’s focus is more scattered as readers are introduced to multiple characters facing barriers to their happiness set up by the Catholic institution of Spain, while the film moves away from this broad cast of characters to focus solely on Ambrosio’s storyline. The characters that remain in this film adaptation are directly related to him.

 Valerio (Rosario/Matilda)
 Valerio is the only name given to the female temptress that sneaks into the monastery to get close to Ambrosio. In the novel, the woman is named Matilda and she uses the name Rosario when she is masquerading as a novice.
 In the film, she wears a mask that is never described in the book, perhaps partly to make it more realistic that she could hide in the monastery. The blank open-mouthed mask makes the character more sinister initially and foreshadows her nefarious intentions. Valerio is also never explicitly called a demon temptress sent by Satan like in the novel, where the Devil claims her as his design.
 In the film, Valerio sexually assaults Ambrosio, which is not in the novel. In the novel, his first sexual experience is of his own free will and fully conscious, even though he is disturbed and heavily influenced by Matilda’s reasoning. In the film’s scene where she is sucking out the poison from his hand, there is also a montage of sexual intercourse between the two, but Ambrosio is ill and mostly unconscious. He also later questions her about what happened, further demonstrating that he did not consent or know what was happening, whereas he does not have this sexual trauma in the novel.

 Antonia’s fate
 In the film, she is not explicitly raped, instead she is influenced with a sprig of myrtle that is supernaturally enhanced, resulting in intercourse.
 In the novel, Ambrosio later drugs Antonia and takes her to a crypt where he rapes her and then murders her as she is escaping. This is fully cut from the film.
 She is not killed at Ambrosio's hand, but instead goes mad, which is not even shown but told to Ambrosio (and the audience) by the Devil.
 Ambrosio bargains for Antonia’s soul at the end of the movie, whereas he was only concerned with himself in the novel, especially by the end when he is on the brink of being killed. 

 Agnes
 In the film, she dies with her baby and haunts Ambrosio once as a ghost.
 She lives in the novel and has a much richer backstory and a happy ending where she ends up with Raymond (Cristobal in the film).
 The film shows her, but only to emphasize Ambrosio’s previous piety and insistence on following the rules and showing no mercy for sins that he later commits himself.
 Her whole back story and connection with her brother, Lorenzo, is not described in the film.

 The Devil
 Only appears as a human in the film.
 He appears in the first scene, making his presence known but not clear. His confession acts as an interesting beginning to the film as it shows how Ambrosio reacts to the horrific sins with no facial expressions and no judgement, even as he describes incest and sexual assault on a niece.

 Elvire’s murder
 In the novel he strangles his mother and gets away with the crime for a time, able to continue to scheme with Matilda (Valerio) about how to gain access to Antonia.
 In the film, he stabs Elvire and gets caught red handed. This is where he is captured, and he is then immediately shown on trial.

 A serpent, not centipede, bites Ambrosio in the rose garden.
 In Lewis’ novel, a serpent bites Ambrosio, making an obvious connection to the Biblical story of Satan disguised as a serpent in the Garden of Eden.
 Moll’s adaptation features a centipede biting and poisoning Ambrosio.

 Death of the accusatory friar
 This scene is not in the novel at all. No other monks suspect Ambrosio at any point.
 It adds another bloody crime to the internal and previously just sexual crimes committed in the monastery. Or it was supernatural intervention to help Ambrosio and Valerio, either way it is only in the movie.

 No familial connections outside of Ambrosio/Elvire/Antonia are discussed.
 In the novel, Lorenzo is Agnes’ brother.
 Agnes is in love and trying to run away with Lorenzo’s friend Raymond (Cristobal in the film).

Reception

Review aggregation website Rotten Tomatoes gives it a 63% approval rating, based on 35 reviews, with an average score of 5.8/10. Its consensus reads, "Visually sharp but only occasionally gripping, The Monk is still watchable thanks in part to Vincent Cassel's charismatic performance." At Metacritic, which assigns a normalized rating out of 100 to reviews from mainstream critics, the film received an average score of 56, based on 12 reviews, indicating "mixed or average reviews".

Screen Daily praised the leading man, "Cassel exudes otherworldly gravitas and his singular looks are perfect for the role." The review continued to note that "Moll uses quaint touches like iris in/iris out and, via painterly photography, makes the most of the contrast between the cool inner sanctum and the sun-baked landscape." Although the reviewer felt that "three quarters of the film are delectably creepy", the finale only "peters out".

References

External links
 
 Radio interview with Vincent Cassel

2011 films
2011 thriller drama films
French thriller drama films
Spanish thriller drama films
2010s French-language films
Films shot in Madrid
Films based on British novels
Films directed by Dominik Moll
2011 drama films
2010s French films